The World War I Memorial is located in Atlantic City, Atlantic County, New Jersey, United States. The memorial was built in 1922, and added to the National Register of Historic Places on August 28, 1981.

The rotunda houses a  bronze statue titled Liberty in Distress by Frederick W. MacMonnies.

Inside the rotunda there are four medallions (Army, Navy, Marines, and Aviation) that alternate around the circumference of the frieze.  The names of battles in which Atlantic City soldiers fought are inscribed upon the architrave.

See also 
 National Register of Historic Places listings in Atlantic County, New Jersey
 Temple of Vesta, Tivoli

References 

Buildings and structures in Atlantic City, New Jersey
Tourist attractions in Atlantic County, New Jersey
World War I memorials in the United States
1922 sculptures
Bronze sculptures in New Jersey
Monuments and memorials on the National Register of Historic Places in New Jersey
National Register of Historic Places in Atlantic County, New Jersey
Statues in New Jersey
Sculptures of women in New Jersey
1922 establishments in New Jersey
New Jersey Register of Historic Places
Liberty symbols
Death in art
Greek Revival architecture in New Jersey